Parkers Creek is a  long 3rd order tributary to the Cape Fear River in Harnett County, North Carolina.

Course
Parkers Creek rises in a pond at Duncan, North Carolina and then flows southwest to join the Cape Fear River about 3 miles west of Cokesbury, North Carolina.

Watershed
Parkers Creek drains  of area, receives about 47.2 in/year of precipitation, has a wetness index of 376.70 and is about 66% forested.

See also
List of rivers of North Carolina

References

Rivers of North Carolina
Rivers of Harnett County, North Carolina
Tributaries of the Cape Fear River